Amelia Clotilda Jennings (died 1895) was a Canadian  poet and novelist who wrote under the pseudonyms Maude Alma and Mileta.  Jennings was born in Halifax, Nova Scotia in a family of a dry-goods merchant and died in Montreal. She published a number of poems, fictionalized letters, and novels, many relating to her native province. Her books include poetry collection Linden Rhymes (1854), "tale and poem" The White Rose in Acadia and Autumn in Nova Scotia (1855), novel Isabel Leicester (1874), and poetry collection North Mountain, near Grand-Pré (1883).

She wrote a poem about Sarah Curran called "Sarah Curran's Song."

References

External links
Isabel Leicester at Project Gutenberg
Jennings's works online

Year of birth unknown
1895 deaths
Canadian women poets
Canadian women novelists
Pseudonymous women writers
19th-century Canadian novelists
19th-century Canadian poets
19th-century Canadian women writers
19th-century pseudonymous writers